Canarium pseudopimela is a tree of Borneo in the incense tree family Burseraceae. The specific epithet  is from the Latin meaning "false pimela", referring to the species' resemblance to Canarium pimela.

Description
Its twigs are brown.

Distribution and habitat
Canarium pseudopimela is endemic to Borneo where it is confined to Sarawak. Its habitat is lowland forests.

References

pseudopimela
Trees of Borneo
Endemic flora of Borneo
Flora of Sarawak
Plants described in 1994
Taxonomy articles created by Polbot